Bohemian or Bohemians may refer to:

Anything of or relating to Bohemia

Beer
 National Bohemian, a brand brewed by Pabst
 Bohemian, a brand of beer brewed by Molson Coors

Culture and arts

 Bohemianism, an unconventional lifestyle, originally practised by 19th–20th century European and American artists and writers.
 Bohemian style, a fashion movement
 La bohème, an opera by Giacomo Puccini
 Bohemian (band), South Korean pop group
 Bohemian glass or crystal
 Edie Brickell & New Bohemians, an alternative rock band formed in the 1980s

Geography
 Bohemian Massif, a mountainous region of central Czech Republic, eastern Germany, southern Poland and northern Austria

Paintings
 The Bohemian (Renoir painting), a painting by Pierre-Auguste Renoir completed in 1868 
 The Bohemian (Bouguereau painting), a painting by William-Adolphe Bouguereau completed in 1890

Peoples
 Bohemians, anyone from or residing in Bohemia
 Bohemian Roma, a subgroup of the Romani people
 Bohemian Romani, a dialect of Romani
 Bohemians (tribe), an early Slavic tribe in Bohemia
 Bohemian language
 Bohemian diaspora
 German Bohemians, ethnically German inhabitants of Bohemia
 Bohemian Jews, Jewish inhabitants of Bohemia

Sports
 Bohemian F.C., an Irish club founded in 1890
 Bohemians 1905, a Czech club founded in 1905
 Bohemian Sporting Club, a former club from the Philippines
 FK Bohemians Prague (Střížkov), a Czech club founded in 1996
 UL Bohemians R.F.C., an Irish rugby union club
 Vålerenga Fotball, a Norwegian club nicknamed The Bohemians.

See also
 Boehmians, in mathematics
 Bohemia (disambiguation)
 Bohemian Reformation, a Christian movement in the late medieval and early modern period
 Bohemian Rhapsody (disambiguation)
 Duchy of Bohemia, 9th–12th centuries
 Kingdom of Bohemia, 1198–1918
 North Bay Bohemian, a newspaper from California, USA
 The Bohemian Girl (disambiguation)
 
 

Language and nationality disambiguation pages